Markus Osthoff (born 19 November 1968 in Saarbrücken) is a retired German football player.

Honours
 DFB-Pokal finalist: 1997–98

References

1968 births
Living people
German footballers
1. FC Saarbrücken players
SV Eintracht Trier 05 players
MSV Duisburg players
Borussia Mönchengladbach players
Eintracht Braunschweig players
Eintracht Braunschweig II players
Bundesliga players
2. Bundesliga players
Sportspeople from Saarbrücken
SV Saar 05 Saarbrücken players
Association football midfielders
Footballers from Saarland
West German footballers